Charles Elliott Wilhelm (born August 26, 1941) is a decorated retired United States Marine Corps General who served two combat tours of duty in Vietnam.  He later served as Commanding General of the 1st Marine Division; as a Deputy Assistant Secretary of Defense; and as the Commander, U.S. Southern Command (1997–2000).  General Wilhelm retired from the Marine Corps in 2000, after 37 years of service.

Biography
Charles E. Wilhelm was born in 1941, a native of Edenton, North Carolina.  Wilhelm graduated from Florida Southern College in 1964 with a B.A. in journalism.  He earned a M.S. degree in management from Salve Regina College in 1971. He is a graduate of the Army Infantry Officer's Advance Course (1971) and the Naval War College (1983), which in 1999 awarded him its Naval War College Distinguished Graduate Leadership Award.

Military career
General Wilhelm held a variety of command positions. He commanded a rifle platoon and company during two tours in Vietnam; served as a company commander in Headquarters Battalion and 3rd Battalion, 8th Marines, 2nd Marine Division; was the Senior Advisor to a Vietnamese Army Battalion; Inspector-Instructor, 4th Reconnaissance Battalion; Deputy Provost Marshal, U.S. Naval Forces Philippines; and commanded the 11th Marine Expeditionary Unit.

General Wilhelm's staff assignments include Assistant Battalion Operations Officer; Operations Officer and Executive Officer, 1st Battalion, 1st Marines. He served on the staffs of III Marine Amphibious Force; Logistics, Plans, and Policy Branch, Installations and Logistics Department, HQMC, and J-3, Headquarters, U.S. European Command.

In August 1988, while assigned as the Assistant Chief of Staff for Operations, II Marine Expeditionary Force, he was promoted to brigadier general, and was subsequently assigned as the Director of Operations, HQMC. In July 1990, he was selected to serve as Deputy Assistant Secretary of Defense for Policy and Missions, Office of the Assistant Secretary of Defense for Special Operations and Low Intensity Conflict. General Wilhelm assumed duties as Commanding General, 1st Marine Division, in July 1992. He served as Commander Marine Forces Somalia from December 1992 to March 1993 as part of the U.S. led coalition in Operation RESTORE HOPE. General Wilhelm was confirmed for promotion to lieutenant general and assumed duties as the Commanding General, Marine Corps Combat Development Command, Quantico, Virginia, July 15, 1994. In August 1995, he was assigned as Commander, U.S. Marine Corps Forces, Atlantic/Commanding General, Fleet Marine Force, Atlantic/Commander, U.S. Marine Corps Forces, Europe/Commander, U.S. Marine Corps Forces, South/Commanding General, II Marine Expeditionary Force/Commanding General, Marine Striking Force Atlantic, Camp Lejeune, North Carolina. He was confirmed for promotion to general and assumed duties as the Commander, U.S. Southern Command on September 25, 1997; he served in this position until October 2000.  General Wilhelm retired from the Marine Corps on November 1, 2000.

Post-retirement
After retiring from the Marine Corps, General Wilhelm was a researcher with the U.S. Army War College Strategic Studies Institute.  General Wilhelm is Distinguished Military Fellow on the staff of the Center for Defense Information. In 2003, Wilhelm became Vice President at Battelle, responsible for homeland security issues.

Awards and decorations
General Wilhelm's personal decorations include:

See also

Center for Defense Information (CDI)
Battelle

References

Notes

1941 births
Living people
People from Edenton, North Carolina
Florida Southern College alumni
United States Marine Corps personnel of the Vietnam War
Recipients of the Silver Star
Recipients of the Gallantry Cross (Vietnam)
Salve Regina University alumni
Naval War College alumni
United States Marine Corps generals
Recipients of the Defense Superior Service Medal
Recipients of the Defense Distinguished Service Medal
Recipients of the Navy Distinguished Service Medal
United States Department of Defense officials